Jenelle Lynn Riley (born September 26, 1982) is an American screenwriter, actress, journalist, and producer. Riley wrote the 2015 short film Warning Labels, directed by Jennifer Morrison, and is the host of Varietys Actors on Actors, for which she has won a Daytime Emmy Award and two Los Angeles Emmy Awards. She is also an editor for Variety and contributor to The Huffington Post. She wrote and directed the award-winning play "A Kind of Love Story" which had its world premiere at Sacred Fools Theater Company in Los Angeles. She is the regular host of career conversations for the SAG-AFTRA Foundation, where she has conducted lengthy interviews with various actors.

Theater career
Riley's first play, "Just Julie," was published when she was a teenager. Her play "Heart Murmurs and Brain Matter" premiered in 2000 in Los Angeles before being staged in London and New York. She followed that with the highly acclaimed "Comfortably Numb" in 2001. Other works include "The Gemini Project," "Duct Tape and Dreams" and "Unholy Matrimony." In 2012, the world premiere of "A Kind of Love Story" took place at Sacred Fools Theatre in Hollywood, earning six L.A. Weekly Award nominations and earning a directing prize for Riley. The play has been published by Stage Rights. In 2017, she wrote and directed "Jane Austen's Emma Frankenstein," also at Sacred Fools.

Filmography

References

Living people
1982 births
American women journalists
Actresses from Salem, Oregon
Writers from Salem, Oregon
Screenwriters from Oregon
21st-century American women